Arsissa is a genus of snout moths. It was described by Ragonot, in 1893, and is known from Spain and Namibia.

Species
 Arsissa atlantica Asselbergs, 2009
 Arsissa ramosella (Herrich-Schäffer, 1852)
 Arsissa transvaalica Balinsky, 1991

References

Phycitini
Pyralidae genera